Corporate sociopolitical activism (CSA) refers to a firm’s public demonstration of support or opposition to a partisan sociopolitical issue. CSA has become increasingly prominent in recent years, as firms have taken stances on issues such as climate change, racial justice, reproductive rights, gun control, immigration, LGBTQ+ rights, and gender equality.

Firms may engage in CSA to appeal to purpose-driven ideals, as well as contribute to more strategic motives, in line with consumers' existing preferences for moral purchasing options. Indeed, a recent study found that 64% of global consumers choose to buy or boycott a given brand on the basis of its political leanings, a result suggesting the increasing importance of ethical consumerism practices.

In addition, the 2020 CMO Survey revealed that a growing proportion of marketing leaders find it acceptable to make changes to products and services in response to political issues (47.2%), have executives speak out on political issues (33.3%), and use marketing communications to speak out on political issues (27.8%). Further, brands engaged in an unprecedented level of activist behavior in response to consumers protesting racial injustice in 2020.

Firms have historically strayed from vocalizing stances on controversial sociopolitical matters, with the understanding that doing so could sever certain stakeholder relationships. However, modern cultural shifts have precipitated a “hyper-partisan” climate, leading to demand for firms to exercise purpose-driven efforts in the marketplace. As stated by Richard Edelman, chief executive officer (CEO) of Edelman, “Brands are now being pushed to go beyond their classic business interests to become advocates. It is a new relationship between a company and consumer, where a purchase is premised on the brand’s willingness to live its values, act with purpose, and, if necessary, make the leap into activism.”

Definition 
CSA is a unique form of cause-related firm behavior defined broadly by two distinct characteristics: publicity and partisanship. Specifically, CSA involves a firm’s public support of or opposition to a partisan sociopolitical issue. Such issues are described as “salient unresolved social matters on which societal and institutional opinion is split, thus potentially engendering acrimonious debate among groups.” Notably, while the controversy surrounding a given issue can change or be resolved, a firm’s efforts may be considered CSA to the extent that they reflect engagement with an issue defined as partisan at a given point in time, politics, and culture. Further, the term “brand activism” has been used to describe similar efforts by individual brands (i.e., owned by firms) to vocalize public stances on sociopolitical issues; brand activism can, thus, be considered CSA delivered through a brand’s voice.

Conceptual distinctions 
CSA is comparable but distinct from two related firm activities: corporate social responsibility (CSR) and corporate political activity (CPA).

Corporate social responsibility 

CSR involves firms’ contributions to widely favored societal goals (e.g., community resources, education, donations to disease prevention research) via philanthropic or charitable efforts, CSA pertains to a firm’s engagement in causes for which there is no universally acceptable “correct” response. Further, CSA may involve a lower level of monetary investment (e.g., a press release, an open letter) compared to CSR; however, there is greater risk associated with CSA, due in part to the potential for backlash from various stakeholders.

Corporate political activity 
CSA is distinct from CPA—a firm’s efforts (e.g., campaign contributions, lobbying, donations to political action committees) to sway political processes and gain policy-related market advantages. While both types of firm activities reflect involvement in the political process, they differ in the extent to which they are publicized. CSA is often utilized as a public demonstration of a firm’s core values and principles. Conversely, CPA is an often-discreet activity that is typically made public only through “accidental disclosure”.

Examples 
Firms have increasingly taken activist stances on sociopolitical issues across a variety of domains.

Racial justice 
Firms have spoken out about racial justice in a number of ways (e.g., affirming support for the Black Lives Matter movement, donating a portion of profits to civil rights organizations).

Among the most prominent examples of racial justice CSA came in September 2018 when Nike announced football player Colin Kaepernick as the spokesperson for its thirtieth anniversary advertisement campaign. Notably, Kaepernick stirred national debate in 2016 by kneeling during the National Anthem in protest of racial inequality and police brutality in the United States. In Nike’s campaign, Kaepernick said, “Believe in something, even if it means sacrificing everything.” News agencies characterized this tagline as implicit support for Kaepernick’s platform of racial justice advocacy.

While Nike’s decision initially sparked consumer backlash, as well as a dip in stock price, the firm’s value reached an all-time high only a week later. According to a Quinnipiac University poll, much of the persistent consumer support for the ad came from consumers between 18-34, two-thirds of whom approved of Nike’s actions.

This case has been considered a critical turning point in the emergence of CSA as a prominent brand practice. Additional examples of racial justice CSA include the following:
 Home Depot CEO Craig Meaner said in a statement, "We are all confronting deep pain and anguish over the senseless killing of George Floyd, Ahmaud Arbery, and other unarmed Black men and women in our country. We cannot ignore that their deaths are part of a pattern of racism and reflect the harsh reality that as a nation we are much too far from fulfilling the promise of equal justice for all."
 Netflix promoted a new Black Lives Matter collection to U.S. subscribers, featuring a number of television and movie titles about racial injustice and the experience of Black Americans.
 Walmart announced that it will donate $100 million over five years to create a new center for racial equity.

LGBTQ+ rights 
Firms have utilized both internal and external resources to take a stand on issues facing the LGBTQ+ community. For instance, many firms act as corporate sponsors of Pride parades internationally and assist in LGBTQ+ community-building efforts.

Published since 2002, the Human Rights Campaign has utilized its Corporate Equality Index (CEI) to measure the extent to which American businesses treat equitably their LGBTQ+ employees, customers, and investors. Criteria used to assess companies include, among others, a written policy of non-discrimination based on sexual orientation, gender identity, and gender expression; appropriate and respectful advertising to the LGBTQ+ community; and transgender-inclusive health benefits.

There has been an increase in the number of firms with a perfect CEI rating every year since the tool’s inception. Such firms frequently release statements and press releases to express satisfaction at having been recognized for their diversity and inclusivity efforts.

Notably, many brands have also released Pride-related merchandise in recent years to signal support for LGBTQ+ rights, as well as position themselves as advocates for LGBTQ+ consumers.
 Converse released a collection of Pride-inspired low- and high-top sneakers featuring a rainbow flag with a brown and black stripe dedicated to queer people of color. Also included in this collection was a pair of sneakers adorned with the pink, light blue, and white colors of the transgender flag.
 Sephora’s “We Love Pride” make-up collection featured a metallic red lipstick called “Love Is Love.” The brand donated a portion of sales to a variety of LGBTQ+ charities.
 Fossil released its second annual Pride Watch, featuring a bezel with all the colors of the rainbow flag. U.S. sales benefitted the Hetrick-Martin Institute, the nation’s oldest and largest LGBTQ+ youth organization.

Climate change 
While sustainable business practices have long been a component of firms’ CSR activities, some companies have taken an activist stance in recent years to address climate change policy more broadly.

For example, the brand Patagonia has established itself as a chief market-based environmental justice advocate. Its November 2011 “Don’t Buy This Jacket” spot in the New York Times served as both an advertisement for the firm’s merchandise and an imperative for consumers to reduce their carbon footprint. The ad’s message leveraged an anti-consumerist ideology to encourage the purchase of long-lasting outdoor apparel and deter the proliferation of the fast fashion industry.
 Amazon announced in 2019 that it would transition to 80% renewable energy usage by 2024, and then to zero emissions by 2030. The firm’s CEO Jeff Bezos also launched the Bezos Earth Fund in February 2020, committing $10 billion to assist in “any effort that offers a real possibility to help preserve and protect the natural world.”
 Google announced in September 2020 that it is investing in manufacturing regions to create new carbon-free energy and help cities reduce their emissions.

Gun control 
A number of major firearms sellers have modified their gun sales policies, particularly as a response to mass shootings taking place in the U.S. Two such notable examples are the following:
 Ed Stack, CEO of Dick’s Sporting Goods, announced in February 2018 that stores would end the sales of high-capacity magazines, as well as sales of guns to persons under the age of 21. The firm also took legal action by urging Congress to ban assault-style weapons, raise the minimum age to purchase a gun to 21, and outlaw sales of high-capacity magazines and bump stocks. The firm cited the Stoneman Douglas High School shooting in Parkland, Florida as an event that directly influenced its decisions.
 Walmart CEO Doug McMillon released a statement containing news of the firm’s plans to discontinue sales of short-barrel rifle ammunition, handgun ammunition, and handguns. This statement also requested that customers no longer openly carry firearms into Walmart or Sam’s Club stores, including those in states in which “open carry” practices are permitted. The firm cited the 2019 El Paso shooting, which took place in a Walmart store, as a critical incident shaping its decisions.

Other domains 
Firms have engaged in CSA in a number of other domains. Below are select examples.

Reproductive health care 
M.A.C. Cosmetics has worked with Planned Parenthood since 2008 and contributed over $2 million to the organization. According to John Demsey, executive group president of the brand’s parent company Estée Lauder, “It is so important for people of all ages, all races and all genders to get the accurate information and care they need so they can live their best, healthiest lives, but we see that a lot of people aren’t seeking that information and care because of stigmas that disproportionately affect women, people of color and the LGBTQ community.”

Net Neutrality 
Burger King advocated for Net Neutrality with a January 2018 ad that illustrated the concept of paid prioritization through hamburger sales—customers were told they would have to wait longer for their food, unless they were willing to pay a premium for immediate service.

Gender non-discrimination 
Target issued a statement in September 2016 encouraging store employees and patrons to use the restroom or fitting room facility that corresponds with their gender identity.

Immigration 
In January 2017, nearly 100 Silicon Valley firms filed an amicus brief against the Trump administration’s anti-immigration policy directed at refugees, travelers, and visa holders originating from predominantly Muslim portions of the world.

Controversial symbols 
NASCAR announced in July 2020 that it would ban the Confederate flag from all its racing venues

Potential business benefits 
Research has uncovered the broader financial implications of CSA on firm value including improving firm's attractiveness to a wider segment of investors and customers. On average, investors respond negatively to CSA, though there are a number of factors that may buffer or even reverse this relationship. Most notably, a firm’s CSA elicits positive abnormal stock returns when there is high alignment between the firm’s CSA and the values of its stakeholders (e.g., customers, employees, state legislators). In particular, researchers observed an increase in sales growth over the next quarter and year when CSA aligned with customer values.

In addition, a number of CSA characteristics have been shown to further heighten investor response: if the activism takes the form of an action, is announced by the CEO, is not justified by a business objective, and is announced alone (vs. in a coalition with other firms). Notably, managers may find it especially appropriate to engage in CSA if they are deeply committed to activism, and it aligns with their strategic objectives (i.e., acquiring a more liberal or conservative customer base).

Still, CSA requires strategic deliberation. CSA activities may signal to stakeholders that the firm is willing to engage in risky behaviors and even divert resources from profit-generating activities. Given the enduring nature of activism, it is often plausible for investors to believe CSA serves as a value-based indication of a firm’s future decisions, particularly those related to purpose, reputation, and relationship management.

Criticisms and concerns 
Critics have expressed concern about the degree to which CSA is helpful, either for advancing sociopolitical causes or as a firm activity more generally.

Woke-washing 
A common argument is that firms are profit-seeking and, thus, care more about image and reputation than the causes they address. Some have referred to firms’ political behavior as akin to "woke-washing", a pejorative term adapted from the similar concept of greenwashing. Woke-washing is a critique leveraged against firms thought to “appropriate the language of social activism into marketing material."

Critics have further argued that firms may utilize greater capital on the appearance of progressivism (i.e., through advertisements and promotional efforts) than on actual cause-related awareness or fundraising efforts. In such circumstances, activism has been criticized as a deceptive marketing tool for capturing demand among belief-driven consumers. Action-based follow-through could be important for fostering perceptions of authentic connection to supported sociopolitical causes. In a recent Harvard Business Review article, journalists Erin Dowell and Marlette Jackson said, “Empty company statements can seem to say that Black lives only matter to big business when there’s profit to be made.”

Ideology-based capitalism 
Others have argued whether firms should engage with sociopolitical issues at all. In particular, some critics have shunned the idea that market-based entities should influence or have a say in what is considered right and wrong.

Such criticism came to a head in January 2019 when Gillette released an advertisement inspired by the #MeToo movement called “We Believe: The Best a Man Can Be.” The roughly two-minute clip depicted images of boys and men engaged in bullying, sexual harassment, and other aggressive behaviors. It also demonstrated more positive helping actions, ostensibly offering a more compassionate model for masculinity norms

Overall, Gillette’s ad was not well-received. It currently has among the greatest number of dislikes on YouTube in the platform’s history, and prominent celebrities expressed disdain for the piece. English broadcaster Piers Morgan panned the ad on Twitter: “I've used @Gillette razors my entire adult life, but this absurd virtue-signaling PC guff may drive me away to a company less eager to fuel the current pathetic global assault on masculinity. Let boys be damn boys. Let men be damn men.”

References 

Corporate social responsibility
Applied ethics
Codes of conduct
Morality
Social ethics
Social finance